The Dubikowski family - is an ancient Polish-Lithuanian (Ruthenian) noble family with the Ostoja coat of arms, belonging to the heraldic Clan Ostoja (Moscics). The date when the Dubikowski family joined the heraldic Clan Ostoja (Moscics) is unknown. This could have happened in the 15th-16th centuries.

Families origin and prehistory 
In the Files about noble families’ origin the kin of Dubikowski is located in the sixth part (ancient descent families) and belongs to a clan Ostoja coat of arms. As noted in these Files of 1795: "Under the evidence of the ancient Polish chronicles and armorials, the Dubikowski family was awarded nobility from the earliest times (natural nobility). The Dubikowski family occupied many different positions in the Kingdom of Poland, the Grand Duchy of Lithuania and Russian Empire, and was granted privileges, enjoyed all the prerogatives and rights of the nobility".

According to family traditions and patrimonial book the Dubikowski kin is the descendants of one of the oldest Slovic-Aryan dynasty. It is fine and entirely correct to say that this Hierophant-Warrior dynasty, which ruled almost the all ancient World, bore the unique Devine kingship. It was a Universal Vedic Slovic-Aryan civilization existed for millennia in the territory from Dublin to Vladivostok, which is eloquently testified by the single-type ring-shaped ancient settlements-observatories throughout Eurasia and burial mounds.

According to the ancestral family book, the legendary Oleg Veschiy was the ancestor of the Dubikowski kin. It is well known that Rurik arrived to Rusia in 862 not alone, but with his kin: two native brothers Sineus and Truvor, and Oleg Veschiy / Prophet (duke Fulcoald - Ogneljod - Ful'coal'd - Kol'd - Kold - Holga - Oleg).

Oleg Veschiy ('prophetic') is a prince, wise man - hierophant and warlord from a family (dynasty) close to the Rurikovich's.  In the Arabian sources there is a repeated reference to the "tsar of Slovs" by the name "al-Olvang" (Oleg) as a "Franconian duke". Byzantine chroniclers (as Constantine VII) called Oleg "god-inspired", indicating at the same time his Frankish origin. According to the Danish legend Oleg's wife was the daughter of the East Slovic ruler Budimir. In 882 Oleg has won tribes of the western Poles (Lechity) at the coasts of Goplo and Warta (according to Polish historians Lovmianski and Krotossky). He was Leshik, the father of Zemomysl (890-964) and the grandfather of Meshko I (Dag/Dagobert) (930-992) and Stibor (Ostoy). It was Oleg Veschiy who not only founded the first dynasty of Piasts (essentially close to the Rurikids), but also gave the self-name of the future Poland (from Oleg-Leh we get Lehi-Lehits and Po-Lehia, i.e. Poland). As is known, his other son, Oleg of Moravia, was in 940-949 the prince of Great Merovia (Moravia). After the seizure of Merovia by the Ugricians, Oleg went north to his brother Zemomysl. (Two sons of Oleg are told about in Moravian legends: Asmund (most likely Zemomysl, Semyamysl) and Oleg, Oleja, Elijah Moravlanin (Oleg of Moravia). According to annals Oleg Veschiy (the prophet) founded Moscow, and constructed set of other cities. In a study by P. Khavsky "On the Great Princes, contemporaries of Moscow", published in 1851, "...In one of the surviving manuscript legends it was confirmed that Oleg came to the land surrounded by the rivers Yauza, Neglinna and Moskva, and ordered to lay the city there". The legends associated with the personality of Oleg were also preserved in the semi-mythical Scandinavian saga of Odd Orvar (Arrow), indicating that the monarch was widely known in Northern Rusia - Scandinavia. Also Oleg (al-Olvang) was well known to Arab geographers-travelers, in particular al-Masudi.

Furthermore, Oleg's descendants devoted themselves to military service, chivalry on the coast of Prusia and priesthood in the Sacred grove at the evergreen oak on the river Dubisse. This kin gave the Lithuanian Grand Dukes Troyden (1220-1282) and his sons Budikid (1240-1290) and Budivid (not the ancestors of the Gedeminoviches).

REMARK. In the saga of Odd Orvar (Arrow), it is written that Oleg (Odd) ruled from about 850 to 862 the lands of Scandinavia and Albion. According to DNA research data, Oleg the prophetic is the father of Harald the Fair-Haired, the first konung of Norway and the founder of the Horfager dynasty. Horfagers subjugated the lands of Albion and the Crovan dynasty went from them, which is also confirmed by DNA analysis data.

Many other well-known and powerfully families of Eurasia genetically also belong to the genus of Oleg Veschiy / the Prophet.

The estates belonging to the family 
Listed below are the most important lands belonging to the Dubikowski of the Ostoja CoA.

More important land estates: tract Pavlovskoe (Branikozhi) near Novogrudok; estates near Smolensk: Poretskoye, Stankovo, Korenkovo and Folvark Kovalev;  Verzhbolovo (now Virbalis, Prusia, Lithuania) and Osovets, Korytno and Zaluzhnoye in the Oshmiany region, the estates Berezhanka, Domaninka, Kulikovo and Vyshogrodek near Kremenets, Gostomel, Berdniki near Fastov.

Family representatives 

 Samuel Dubikowski (1550-1630, XV from the tribe of Oleg the Prophet) - for his chivalrous bravery received lands in the tract Pavlovskoe (Branikozhi) near Novogrudok from Sigismund III Vasa in 1592.
 Boleslaw Dubikowski - Smolensk's Deputy Cup-bearer (Podchashiy) in the early to mid 1600s. His wife Anna Skopovna was a daughter of Hans Skopovny - tiun (ruler) of Samogitia (land Zhemoytskaya). They owned estates near Smolensk: Poretskoye, Stankovo, Korenkovo and Folvark Kovalev. Hans Skopovny was the son of the Royal secretary and Skerstomon derzhavtsa (tiun, ruler) in 1527–1529, Stanislav Skop from Dovsprung dynasty and his wife, Princess Helena Andreevna Sangushko (1490-1561). The parents of Princess Helena Andreevna were Prince Andrei Alexandrovich Sangushko (1454-1534, CoA Pogon) and Princess Ksenia-Maria Ivanovna Ostrozhskaya (b. 1458), who was the sister of the Grand Crown Hetman Prince Konstantin Ostrogski. The Ostrogski princes family were descendants of the Turov-Pinsk princes, who were descendants of the Grand Duke of Kiev Svyatopolk (Mikhail) Izyaslavich (November 8, 1050 – April 16, 1113) from the Rurikid dynasty.
 Joannes Dubikowski - a nobleman, participated in the trial of the city Chelm court in 1634.
 Katerina Dubikowska - in the late 1600s was the wife of Michael Surin (his own coat of arms - derived from the coat of arms Massalski). Michael Surin was the son of Elias Surin, colonel of the Lithuanian army and deputy starost of Mstislavl. They owned many estates in the Kiev land and Mogilev land including Gostomel. Previously, the Surins owned the Chernobyl Castle from 1548 to 1550.
 Mikhal Dubikowski - a comrade of the armored regiment (heavy noble cavalry - 'hussariya'); he received from the king John III (Jan Sobieski) the rank of the Pinsk bridge guard (mostovnichiy) in 1692. He owned several estates in the Mozyr district including the estates of Verzhbolovo (now Virbalis, Prusia, Lithuania) and Osovets.
 Lavrenty Dubikowski - received the rank of Novogrudok cornet 'khorunzhy' from Hetman and Prince Mikhail Kazimir Radzivil in 1751. He owned the estates of Korytno and Zaluzhnoye in the Oshmiany region.
 Jan Dubikowski - a deputy at the Seimik of Minsk in 1787.
 Felician Dubikowski - warden (overseer) of town Zudr (deputy mayor) in Mozyr district.
 Mikołaj Dubikowski - the supervisor and teacher of German at the Kanev Imperial College, late 1790s. 
 Michal Dubikowski - the Rottomier (Captain) of Rechitsa in the middle-to-late 1800s.
 Grzegorz Dubikowski (b. 1777) - the lancer regiment of the early 1800s. 
 Jean Dubikowski - Chevalier of the 17th regiment of the Polish cavalry (lancers of Brigadier General Count Michal Tyszkiewicz) as part of the army of the Grand Duchy of Warsaw in 1812–1815. 
 Jozef Dubikowski - a collegiate assessor in Kremenets in 1870–1876. Together with his wife Apolonia Radzyminska (coat of arms Lis) owned the estates Berezhanka, Domaninka, Kulikovo and Vyshogrodek near Kremenets. 
 Jan Dubikowski and Agata Oranska (coat of arms of the Kosciesza Oransky) owned of the estate Berdniki near Fastov. Married in 1770; son Paul (1778-1832).
 Pawel Dubikowski and Helena (Efimia) Domoracka (coat of arms of Ostoja, b. 1784); son Michal (22.11.1810-1899).
 Michal Dubikowski and Małgorzata Chodakowska (1833-1893), noblewoman and landowner, coat of arms of Dolega. Married in 1860, son August (1863-1943) and daughter Barbara (born 1872). 
 August Dubikowski marries Maryna Franzevna Mankowska (coat of arms Jastrembiec); son Faust (1902-1982).
 Faust Dubikowski - chief veterinarian of Gorodocki region of Lviv from 1946 to 1963, military doctor of the 3rd rank (reserve captain). He was awarded by medals: For the victory over Germany, for the capture of Budapest, for the victory over Japan. In 1935 Faust married Taisia Fedorovna Slawinska (coat of arms Leliva) (1911-1994). 
 Taisia Slawinska (Dubikowska) - came from an ancient noble family of the Slawinski (coat of arms of Leliva). Faust and Taisa had two sons: Arnold (born 1938) and Leonid (1944-2012). She was the chief zootechnician, a deputy of the Gorodocki region council. Taisia was the niece of Maksim Slawinski (1868-1945), a famous diplomat, translator, ethnographer, poet and writer. In 1906 M. Slawinski was a deputy of the first Duma of the Russian Empire, briefly served as a rector of the KPI, represented Ukraine in the interim government of Kerensky, was a representative of Ukraine to the Don Army, from 1919 headed a diplomatic mission from the UNR in Prague.     
 Arnold Dubikowski - submariner-saboteur (P. Sudoplatov school), personal guard of Marshal Zhukov, colonel in the reserve.
 Leonid Dubikowski - PhD (technical sciences), scientist, public person, chorus man. Leonid had about 70 scientific works, including 30 scientific inventions. He worked in the system of Ukrainian SSR Academy of Sciences: Institute of Cybernetics, Institute for Problems of Materials Science, Institute for Metal Physics. In 1970 Leonid was married to Tamara Konstantinovna Kukhta. 
 Tamara Kukhta (Dubikowska) - her great-great-grandfather was Kuncewicz Grzegorz from an ancient noble family (coat of arms 'Swan' – ‘Lebedz’). The wife of Grzegosz had got ancestors in one line from the family of the Counts O'Mahony, the Irish (Ruses) dynasty Eoganahta - the tsars of Tara, Munster and Desmond, Raitlin and Picts in the 4th-10th centuries; and in another line - the family of Lord Gualter de Somerville (1030), William the Conqueror (the first Norman tsar of England (1066-1087), a descendant of the ruler of Normandy and Count of Rouen Rollo) and Princess Gita of Wessex (wife of Vladimir Monomakh). Tamara's great-grandfather was Timothy Nikolaevich of the ancient Martynov family. His father, Nikolai Alekseevich Martynov a retired Major General (coat of arms derived from the coat of arms of 'Swan'), was the governor of Kamchatka during the Crimean War, and after - in Poland he was the military chief of the Petrokov Province. Martynov's ancestors were related to the Paleologues, direct descendants of the last emperor of Byzantium, in the line of one of the brothers of Sophia Paleolog (wife of Vasili II and grandmother of Ivan the Terrible). Also Tamara is connected to the famous family of Olayan and Al-Shareef in Saudi Arabia and the Chinese Northern Han. Tamara was born in Gomel in a family of soldiers December 10, 1944. In 1967 she graduated from the Mechanical and Mathematical Department of Kiev University. In 1976 she received her PhD (in Physics and Mathematics). She worked at the named by Glushkov Institute of Cybernetics. Tamara speaks French and Polish.
 Ari Ros Kan (Stanislav Dubikowski) - the Head of the Great Eurasia (Rus-Orda) Clan. Reserve Major, Arabists, Chorus man, PhD, Director of the Institute for Social and Economic Development. Author of about 30 scientific papers. Author of the monograph "The End of Epoch: The Fatal Choice of Humanity" (2019), which was published in Russian, English and German. Author of the fundamental work "Palimpsest of the Gods: The Secret Revealed" (2020) (Russian). Author of the family book "The Story of One Kin" (2022), Russian and English edition.

See also 

 Ostoja CoA
 Clan Ostoja (Moscics)
 Princess Helena Andreevna Sangushko
 Hans Skopovny

Footnotes

Bibliography 

 Ros Kan. The story of one kin. Kiev 2022, 67 s.
 Herbarz Szlachty Białoruskiej. T. 5. D, J.S.Hlinski [i in.]; red.nauk.A.Rachuba. – Minsk; Belarus, 2018. – 947 s. [16] ark.il.
 Szlachta WKL. J.Lyczkowski. (Rody ktore otrzymaly nobilitacju do roku 1795).  Herbarz szlachty białoruskiej. Tom 5
 Rody rycerskie Wielkiego Księstwa Litewskiego, T. 3 (E-K). Jan Ciechanowicz. Fosze, 2001, s. 203
 Rody rycerskie Wielkiego Księstwa Litewskiego. T. 2 (A-D).  Jan Ciechanowicz. Fosze, 2001, 403 s..
 Miesie̜cznik heraldyczny, Volumes 16–18. Nakł. Oddziału Warszawskiego Polskiego Towarzystwa Heraldycznego, 1937, s. 68, 117.
 Starodawne prawa polskiego pomniki z ksiąg rękopiśmiennych dotąd nieużytych główniej zaś z ksiąg dawnych sądowych ziemskich i grodzkich ziemi krakowskiej, wyd. A. Z. Helcel, Kraków 1870.
 Joseph Tyszkiewicz (hrabia.). Histoire du 17me Régt. de Cavalerie Polonaise (Lanciers du Cte. Michel Tyszkiewicz), 1812-1815. Published by W.L. Anczyc, 1904, s. 68.
 S. Dubikowski. Palimpsest of the Gods. Kiev, 2020, 276 s.
 Akty izdavaemye Vilenskou kommissieiu dlia razbora drevnikh aktov, Т. 23, s.86.

Polish noble families
Polish knighthood families
Ruthenian nobility of the Polish–Lithuanian Commonwealth
Ruthenian noble families
Lithuanian noble families
Russian nobility
Clan of Ostoja